This was the first edition of the tournament.  Liang Chen and Wang Yafan won the title, defeating Varatchaya Wongteanchai and Yang Zhaoxuan in the final 6–3, 6–4.

Seeds

Draw

References 
 Draw

Women's Doubles 
Hua Hin Championships - Doubles
 in women's tennis